Clackers (also known as Clankers, Ker-Bangers, and numerous other names) were toys popular in the late 1960s and early 1970s.

In 1968, tempered glass sphere models emerged that would eventually shatter, sending glass shards into the face of the user and anyone nearby. In the early 1970s, manufacturers changed them to plastic spheres suspended on each string. When they were swung up and down, banging against each other with a lot of force they made the loud "clacking" sound. Clackers are similar in appearance to bolas, the Argentine weapon.

The player holds the tab with the balls hanging below and through up-and-down hand motion makes the two balls swing apart and back together, making the clacking noise that gives the toy its name. With practice one can make the balls swing so that they knock together both above and below the hand.

Safety hazard
Clackers were taken off the market in the United States and Canada when reports came out of children becoming injured while playing with them. Fairly heavy and fast-moving, and made of hard acrylic plastic, the balls would occasionally shatter upon striking each other. In the United States, they were classed as a "mechanical hazard" in United States v. Article Consisting of 50,000 Cardboard Boxes More or Less, Each Containing One Pair of Clacker Balls.

Revival 
A redesigned version of Clackers enjoyed a revival in the 1990s. The new design used modern plastics which would not shatter and two free-swinging, opposing triangles attached to a handle, with weighted balls at the ends. They are often sold in bright neon colors as noisemaker toys or party favors. 

In 2017, the original form of the toy was revived in Egypt and gained publicity among school children. It became famous under the name "Sisi's balls" referring to the testicles of the Egyptian president Abdel Fattah el-Sisi. The police subsequently arrested 41 clacker sellers and confiscated 1,403 pairs of the toy which they considered offensive to the government.

In late 2022, the toy was revived throughout Indonesia and quickly gained fame among the public. They are known as "katto-katto" or "latto-latto". Latto is a Buginese word which means clacking sound, while Katto is its Makassarese counterpart with similar meaning. There is no recorded data showing whether the names are a direct translation of the toy's name in U.S.

In popular culture

Clackers have also made some appearances in pop culture media. In film, they are shown in Beware! The Blob (1972).

Clackers are a plot point in the 1993 "Love and Sausages" episode of The Kids in the Hall TV series.
They were also used as weapons by Joseph Joestar in Battle Tendency, the second story arc of the 1980s manga series JoJo's Bizarre Adventure; their appearance there is anachronistic, as Battle Tendency takes place in 1938. They also reappear in the eighth story arc of the manga, Jojolion, in the final chapter released in 2021.

The toys are featured in the US television shows produced by Dan Schneider, most notably in the 2007 Drake & Josh episode "Megan's First Kiss," and in the 2008 Zoey 101 episode "Rumor of Love".

See also
Conkers
Newton's cradle
Eskimo yo-yo

References

External links

"Clackers" 1971 report from BBC Nationwide

1970s toys
Physical activity and dexterity toys
Toy instruments and noisemakers